Hobson is an unincorporated community in Dent County, in the U.S. state of Missouri.

History
A post office called Hobson was established in 1893, and remained in operation until 1954. The community has the name of T. E. Hobson, the proprietor of a local mill.

References

Unincorporated communities in Dent County, Missouri
Unincorporated communities in Missouri